one-north MRT station is an underground Mass Rapid Transit (MRT) station on the Circle line in Queenstown, Singapore.

Located between Ayer Rajah Avenue and Portsdown Road underneath Fusionopolis Place within one-north, this is the only MRT station to have a name that starts with a lowercased letter and includes a hyphen. The station takes its name from the one-north business park, a reference to Singapore's latitude being (slightly over) one degree north of the equator. The station is nestled within the basement of Fusionopolis, a research and development complex comprising retail outlets and serviced apartments.

History
As part of the survey, one-north was originally named 'Portsdown'. The options involve 'one-north', 'Portsdown' and 'Ayer Rajah'. In the end, one-north was selected in January 2006. Construction began on 12 March that year. The station was opened on 8 October 2011, along with Stages 4 and 5 of the Circle line. The significance of the name one-north is from the fact that Singapore is one-degree to the north of the equator, and also for the fact that the station is close to many Quaternary Industries like Biopolis and Fusionopolis. In addition, it is located between Portsdown Road (bus service 191) and Ayer Rajah Avenue (bus service 91), but it is not near to Mediapolis.

Art in Transit
The artwork featured in this station under the Art in Transit programme is A Visual Narrative Of Pandemonic Rhythmic Movement by Yek Wong. This piece, split in three parts and stretching from above Platform B doors to the skylight, is an abstraction of colours, shapes and lines. The lines are in fact depictions of MRT commuter traffic from morning to evening (going from left to right).

References

External links

 

Railway stations in Singapore opened in 2011
Queenstown, Singapore
Mass Rapid Transit (Singapore) stations